Family Bible is an album by American country music group, the Browns, released in 1996. This release contains all new recordings by the original trio.

Track listing 
"Amazing Grace" (Newton, Walker) – 2:46
"Uncloudy Day" (Kelly) – 2:44
"Mansion over the Hilltop" (Stanphill) – 2:55
"I'll Fly Away" (Brumley) – 2:19
"Family Bible" (Breeland, Buskirk, Gray) – 3:03
"He'll Set Your Fields on Fire" (Ballen, Brackett) – 2:39
"Life's Railway to Heaven" (Abbey, Tilman) – 2:30
"I'll Meet You in the Morning" (Brumley) – 2:29
"The Family Who Prays" (Ira Louvin, Charlie Louvin) – 2:23
"How Great Thou Art" (Boberg) – 2:45

Personnel
Jim Ed Brown – vocals
Maxine Brown – vocals
Bonnie Brown – vocals

References

The Browns albums
1996 albums